John William Atkinson (December 31, 1923 – October 27, 2003), also known as Jack Atkinson, was an American psychologist who pioneered the scientific study of human motivation, achievement and behavior. He was a World War II veteran, teacher, scholar, and long term member of the University of Michigan community.

Atkinson was a leader in establishing motivation as a distinct field of study in psychology research. His belief that scientific progress came from conceptual breakthroughs fueled his formulation and reformulation of a theory of motivation. He was one of the first in psychology to incorporate rigorous mathematical models in his theories and to use computer simulations of these models for experimentation.  He also recognized the importance of measurement in science, maintaining a career-long interest in the refinement of measures of motivation by means of content analysis of imaginative thought using, for example, the Thematic Apperception Test which he developed jointly with his mentor David C. McClelland. He is well known for establishing measures for motives of achievement, affiliation, fear, sex, risk-taking behavior, and aggression. His discipline-changing ideas were followed around the world.  In recognition, he received in 1979 the American Psychological Association's highest award, the Gold Medal for Distinguished Scientific Contributions.

Atkinson was born in Jersey City, NJ, to Frank G. and Wilhelmina "Minnie" Atkinson. He attended public schools in Oradell NJ, graduating from Dwight Morrow High School in Englewood NJ.  He enlisted in the U.S. Army Air Corps, earning his wings in 1944.  He served as an advanced instrument flight instructor for  the B-25 and other bombers.  On earning his wings Jack married his high-school sweetheart Mary Jane Wanta.  They were married in 1944 in Macon, GA.

After the war Atkinson completed his undergraduate psychology degree with Honors at Wesleyan University, graduating in the middle of the 1946-47 academic year.  As a lecturer at Wesleyan University, he began to pursue his interests in basic research on the arousal of human needs and behavior  with the financial support of  the Office of Naval Research and collaboration with David McClelland.  Atkinson was awarded his doctorate in Psychology in 1950 at the University of Michigan. He was invited to join the faculty of the University of Michigan in the Psychology Department where he remained his entire career (1950 - 1985).

Atkinson was devoted to the teaching of undergraduates throughout his career. As one of the original founders of the University of Michigan's Honors Program in the College of Literature, Science and the Arts, Professor Atkinson fostered unique opportunities and created multi-disciplinary courses to challenge undergraduate students.  He authored and edited many books and articles on the scientific study  of human motivation, achievement and behavior. Many of his books have been translated into other languages, including Russian, German, and Spanish. His theoretical and experimental work spanned decades and spawned many doctorates.

Atkinson was elected a Fellow of the American Academy of Arts and Sciences in 1979. Other awards and honors include a Guggenheim Fellowship (1960), participation twice as a Fellow at the Center for Advanced Study in the Behavioral Sciences at Stanford University, Fellow of the American Psychological Association, an Honorary Doctorate from Ruhr University, Germany, Wesleyan University Distinguished Alumni Award, the Association for Psychological Science: William James Fellow Award, and the American Psychological Association's highest award, the Gold Medal for Distinguished Scientific Contribution. Atkinson was honored on his retirement with a special colloquium at the University which brought together a number of his former students and colleagues who spoke of his inspiration and contributions to the science of human motivation.  He was named Professor Emeritus in 1985.

Atkinson insisted on ethical behavior and highly valued the fundamental freedoms on which the USA was founded. An expression of his support for a free press was his role as a member of the Board of Control of the Michigan Daily during the turbulent 1960s.   In the early 1970s, his beliefs led him to become outraged by the behavior of President Richard M. Nixon, whom he viewed as a threat to liberty and justice.  Jack organized and led public meetings and demonstrations denouncing President Nixon and vigorously promoted Nixon's impeachment by Congress.

Publications: Books
"Studies in Projective Measurement of Achievement Motivation", By John William Atkinson, University of Michigan Microfilms, 1950.
The Achievement Motive, By McClelland, D. C., Atkinson, J. W., Clark, R. A., 4 Lowell, E. L.,  New York: Appleton-Century-Crofts, 1953.
"Nebraska Symposium on Motivation", By Marshall R. Jones and John William Atkinson, University of Nebraska Press, 1954.
Motives in Fantasy, Action, and Society: a method of assessment and study, By John W. Atkinson, Van Nostrand (1958)  
"Achievement Motive and Text Anxiety Conceived as Motive to Approach Success and Motive to Avoid Failure", By John William Atkinson and George H. Litwin, Bobbs-Merrill Company, 1960. 
Effects of ability grouping in schools: Related to individual differences in achievement-related motivation, final report, By John W. Atkinson and Patricia O'Connor, Ann Arbor: University of Michigan, College of Literature, Science, and the Arts, Dept. of Psychology (1963) 
An Introduction to Motivation, By John William Atkinson, D. Van Nostrand Company, Inc (1965), Oxford, England: Van Nostrand; (1964), 
Human motivation: a symposium, By Marshall R. Jones and John William Atkinson, University of Nebraska Press; 1st Edition (1965)
The Dynamics of Action, By John William Atkinson and David Birch, New. York: Wiley (1970)  
A Theory of Achievement Motivation, By John William Atkinson and Norman T. Feather, Volume 6, Wiley, (1966), Krieger Pub Co (June 1, 1974), 
Motivation and Achievement, By John William Atkinson and Joel O. Raynor, Winston; [distributed by Halsted Press Division, New York] (1974) , 
Personality, Motivation and Achievement, By John William Atkinson and Joel O. Raynor, Hemisphere Pub. Corp. (1978) , 
Personality, Motivation, and Action: Selected papers (Centennial psychology series), By John William Atkinson, Praeger (1983), 
Motivation, Thought, and Action, By Julius Kuhl, and John W. Atkinson, New York: Praeger Publishers (June 6, 1986) 
"Dictionary of Psychology", By John William Atkinson, Eric Berne, and Robert Sessions Woodworth, 4th Edition, GOYL SaaB, 1988.

References

External links
Burial
Obituary
Frontiers of Motivational Psychology:  Essays in Honor of John W. Atkinson
John Simon Guggenheim Memorial Foundation A Fellows Page
Wesleyan University Distinguished Alumni Award
William James Fellow Award

1923 births
2003 deaths
20th-century American psychologists
Wesleyan University alumni
University of Michigan alumni
University of Michigan faculty
Fellows of the American Academy of Arts and Sciences
Fellows of the American Psychological Association
American military personnel of World War II